Georgiyevskaya is a rural locality (a village) and the administrative center of Korobitsynskoye Rural Settlement, Syamzhensky District, Vologda Oblast, Russia. The population was 212 as of 2002. There are 8 streets.

Geography 
Georgiyevskaya is located 38 km east of Syamzha (the district's administrative centre) by road. Martyanikha is the nearest rural locality.

References 

Rural localities in Syamzhensky District